Plastic Utopia is a 1997 independent comedy written by David and Nathan Zellner.  It was directed by David Zellner.  It was the first feature film made by the Zellner Brothers.

The film tells the story of an embittered mime, James (David Zellner), who decides to turn to crime along with his roommate, Frank (Nathan Zellner).

Cast

Production 

After David Zellner graduated from the University of Texas film program, he and his brother Frank began making shorts in their hometown of Austin, Texas. They shot Plastic Utopia, their first feature, in about 25 days.

Reception 
Merle Bertrand of Film Threat wrote of the film: "Loaded with brilliant art design, hysterically demented sight gags, and 'Ick! Why did I laugh at that?' dialogue, 'Plastic Utopia' is an evil gem waiting to be discovered."

At the 1997 Austin Film Festival, it was a nominee for Best Feature Film, losing to Robert Bella's Colin Fitz Lives!.

References

External links 
 
 

1997 films
Films set in Texas
Films shot in Austin, Texas
American independent films
1990s English-language films
1990s American films